Dichelostemma is a genus of  North American plants closely related to the genus Brodiaea and sometimes regarded as part of that group.

Dichelostemma is classified in the cluster-lily subfamily within the asparagus family. in the latest Angiosperm Phylogeny Group classification (2009). Older sources often placed it in the lily family; earlier versions of the APG classifications used the family Themidaceae.

The genus is native to the North America, especially in northern California, but also east to New Mexico and north to British Columbia and south into northwestern Mexico.

These plants grow from perennial corms that produce a raceme or umbel-like inflorescence. The flowers are bell- or tube-shaped and produce capsules with black seeds. The name, from the Greek for "toothed crown", refers to the stamen appendages.

Diversity
Species

Dichelostemma capitatum (Benth.) Alph.Wood – blue dicks – has been moved to Dipterostemon capitatus.

Cultivars
Dichelostemma 'Pink Diamond' - probably D. ida-maia × D. congestum (sometimes called Dichelostemma congestum).

References

 
Asparagaceae genera
Flora of Northwestern Mexico
Flora of the Western United States
Flora of Western Canada
Taxa named by Carl Sigismund Kunth
Garden plants of North America